Abdul Qadir Junejo (13 September 1945 – 30 March 2020) was a novelist, playwright and columnist who wrote in Sindhi, Urdu and English.

Early life 
Junejo was born in the small village of Jinhan, Tharparkar, Sindh. His father was Mureed Hussain Junejo who was a police officer.

Junejo received his primary education in his native village of Jinhan. He then attended  the University of Sindh where he earned a Bachelor of Arts, a Bachelor of Education and a Master of Arts in sociology.

Career
In 1962, Junejo started working as a primary school teacher, becoming a secondary school teacher in 1972. He was then appointed Director at the Institute of Sindhology, Jamshoro. He remained chairman of Sindhi Language Authority from 15 September 2005 to 10 May 2008. He wrote 22 Sindhi dramas for radio and 11 Urdu dramas for television.

Publications
Junejo wrote books in English and Sindhi.  
Watoon, Ratyoon Ain Rol (1973)
Shikliyoon (1979)
Weender Wahi Lahandar Sijj (1984)
Wada Adeeb Wadyoon Galhyoon (1984)
Sono Roop Sijj (1986)
Everest te Charhai (1987)
Kursi (1998)
Chho Chha Ain Keein (1999)
Khat bin Adeeban Ja (1999)
Dar Dar ja Musafir (2001)
Wan Wan Jee Kathiee (2002)
The Dead River (2014) English

Dramas and serials
He wrote dramas and serials that aired on Pakistan Television Corporation and commercial channels. He gained popularity in South Asia from his dramas Paranda and Dhool. He wrote six Sindhi language Drama serials and 13 in Urdu language, aired on Media of Pakistan.

Recognition
The Government of Pakistan and Government of Sindh awarded him Pride of Performance in 2008 and Latif Award in 2016. He received several awards from local organizations.

Death
He died on 30 March 2020 in Jamshoro due to liver disease.

References

External links
 Abdul Qadir Junejo’s Official Website

2020 deaths
1945 births
Sindhi people
Recipients of Latif Award
Pakistani male short story writers
Pakistani short story writers
Pakistani Muslims
Pakistani dramatists and playwrights
Pakistani columnists
Pakistani television writers
Recipients of the Pride of Performance
Sindhi-language writers
Urdu-language writers
Pakistani novelists
20th-century Pakistani writers
20th-century novelists
20th-century dramatists and playwrights
20th-century Pakistani male writers
21st-century Pakistani writers
21st-century novelists
21st-century dramatists and playwrights
21st-century male writers
People from Tharparkar District